William Burgess Pryer (7 March 1843 in London, England; – 7 January 1899 in Suez, Egypt) was the first British Resident in Sandakan of North Borneo. Pryer's character is described as adventurous, diligent, and goal-oriented. For example, he knew that before exploring his career in Shanghai, he had explored large parts of the Spanish East Indies (Philippines), and he was a former amateur boxing champion.

Personal life 
Pryer was born in London on 7 March 1843 as the son of Thomas and Isabel Pryer. He was the elder brother of H. Pryer (died in 1888), who is well known in connection with Japanese Lepidoptera and was a corresponding member of the Zoological Society since 1880.

Early career 
In his earlier days, he was an enthusiastic collector of British Lepidoptera. In 1860, he went out to China in connection with the silk and tea house of his relatives Messrs. Thorne Bros., Shanghai, where he remained for twelve years, and devoted considerable attention to collecting the Lepidoptera, of which very little was then known. An account of an expedition he made to the wonderful Snowy Valley appeared in the 'Entomologist's Monthly Magazine,' vol. xiv. Among the results of his work in China was the discovery of many new species, which were described by Messrs. Butler, Moore, and others, and a few by himself in a paper in the 'Cistula Entomologiea,' vol. ii. The collection he formed there afterwards passed into the possession of Messrs, Salvin, Godman and the British Museum. In 1887, he wrote on the butterflies of Borneo  with William Lucas Distant.

North Borneo Chartered Company 
He then began his professional career as an accountant at Thorne & Company, a British company in Shanghai. During his time in China where he met Baron von Overbeck and Alfred Dent, who negotiated with the rulers of the territories in northern Borneo a concession for their colonial interests. Overbeck and his business partners then sailed to England to raise funds for the planned company. After a short experience of business in London, he began to travel to North Borneo in 1877. After the treaty had been done with the help of William Clark Cowie, a European close friend of the Sultan of Sulu on 22 January 1878, Pryer was given the title Resident of the East Coast on 11 February 1878 as a sign of their claim to the new territory in northern Borneo at the old trading station of Cowie.

The trading station is located on Timbang Island because of German settlers who is the predecessors of Sandakan, although located further southwest of today's port town. From his provisional "resident", Pryer began to explore the environment and the implementation of Overbeck's orders to build up friendly relations with the indigenous population, respecting the local customs, to include their chiefs in jurisprudence and to deal with matters of acquisition and sale of land concerned. In September 1878, Pryer administration was tested for the time as on 4 September; El Dorado, a Spanish cannon boat had entered the port. The boat captain, Lobe informed Pryer that he would raise the Spanish flag on the order. Pryer resist and convinced Suluk chief Nakoda Alee to position his warriors in front of the houses in full warfare. In view of the belligerent presence, the Spaniards renounced further hostilities and announced to return with reinforcement from Manila; a threat which has never been materialise.

On 15 June 1879, the German settlement became a victim of flames and was burnt down completely, Pryer took the opportunity to move the settlement to the present place in Sandakan Bay. His decision proved to be a wise decision because the settlement that was founded on 21 July 1879 on the previously uninhabited jungles and mangrove forests grew faster than any other places in North Borneo. Pryer named the settlement as Elopura and became the founder of Sandakan. It was also Pryer, who proposed to make William Hood Treacher as the governor of North Borneo. Treacher had already been present at the negotiations with the Sultan of Sulu, and had appointed Pryer as a consular agent, before being left by Overbeck in the German settlement. While Treacher and Pryer united by the enthusiasm with which they pioneered their task, but with the arrival of other officials increasingly led to conflicts.

On 10 December 1883, Pryer married Ada Blanche Locke and began to retire from the administration post. After his retirement, he purchased the Bai Island in Sandakan Bay, planting coconuts, coffee and betel nut palms and ran cattle. At Beatrice Estate, which is another plantation near Elopura, Pryer experimented with the cultivation of new products. He completely failed from the cultivation of tobacco starting in 1892, but rather predicted a decade before the natural rubber boom that the rubber tree was the ideal working plant for the indigenous coastal inhabitants.

Correspondence with Rizal 
Pryer and his wife met with José Rizal, the national hero of the Philippines, on their trip to Hong Kong sometime in 1892. Rizal shared his idea of a Filipino community in North Borneo for those who were dispossessed of their lands in Calamba by the Dominicans under the North Borneo Project. Pryer was receptive of the idea, and corresponded with Rizal to finalise the details of the lease. Rizal then request the permission of the Governor-General of the Philippines at the time, Eulogio Despujol for the proposed project and he also reportedly request for permission to change his nationality to be qualified to emigrate to North Borneo, although the request were rejected by the Governor-General.

Retirement and death 
Pryer completely retired from working in 1892 after an agreement with the supervisory board of the North Borneo Chartered Company to acquire his estate about 20 kilometres north of Sandakan along with a further property at Kabeli, an inflow of Sandakan Bay where Pryer used to cultivate sugar cane, nutmeg, cocoa, cotton, gambier plant and rubber. At the same time, his health have been getting worsened; as he was increasingly suffering from severe and unexplained painful conditions. Following this, Pryer decided to return to England in 1898. Pryer died on the way to England between 7–8 January 1899 at Suez and was buried there on 11 January. He left his wife without any children.

Legacy 

In honour for Pryer, a memorial in the form of a fountain stand in the town of Sandakan. An inscription on the monument says:

Notes

Literature 
 K. G. Tregonning "William Pryer, The Founder of Sandakan", Journal of the Malayan Branch of the Royal Asiatic Society, Vol. 27, No. 1 (165) (May, 1954), pp. 35–50
 
 Mrs. W.B. Pryer: "A Decade In Borneo", London, 1893

References 

1843 births
1899 deaths
Collectors from London
City founders
Sandakan
Businesspeople from London
British expatriates in Indonesia
History of Sabah
North Borneo Chartered Company administrators
19th-century English businesspeople